Thorvald Matheus "Torden" Olsen (30 July 1889 – 2 November 1938) was a Norwegian wrestler and sports official.

He became Norwegian champion in his weight class in 1912, 1914, 1915 and 1918. He became Nordic champion in 1918. He represented the club IF Ørnulf. He also wrestled two bouts at the 1912 Olympic Games, both against Finns.

Olsen was a board member of Arbeidernes Idrettsopposisjon from its inception in May 1922. After the creation of the Workers' Confederation of Sports in 1924, Olsen became Norwegian workers' champion in wrestling in 1925, 1927 and 1928. He served as a board member of the Workers' Confederation of Sports from 1925 to 1927, deputy board member from 1927 to 1928 and chairman from 1928 to 1931. He was in charge with arranging the Winter Spartakiad in 1928.

IF Ørnulf was not a workers' sports club, thus Olsen resigned his membership. He then set out to replace the distinguished wrestling club for union workers, Fagforeningenes IF, which had left the Workers' Confederation of Sports in 1926. Olsen founded a new club, Fagforeningenes IF av 1926, which quickly achieved sporting success. Olsen was also a wrestling coach in the club SK Sleipner. Olsen died of a stroke in November 1938.

References

1889 births
1938 deaths
Wrestlers at the 1912 Summer Olympics
Norwegian male sport wrestlers
Olympic wrestlers of Norway
Norwegian sports executives and administrators
Norwegian socialists
Sportspeople from Oslo